Parnassius nomion, the Nomion Apollo, is a forest steppe butterfly which is found in the Urals, Altai, south Siberia, Amur and the Ussuri region, Mongolia, China and Korea. It is a member of the snow Apollo genus (Parnassius) of the swallowtail family (Papilionidae).

Populations vary throughout its range and there are very many described subspecies. The adult flies from July to mid-August and the larvae feed on Sedum and Orostachys (Crassulaceae).

Description
Similar to Parnassius apollo geminus but differs in the vitreous marginal band of the forewing being broken up into elongate arched spots or lunules, and in the hindwing bearing dark marginal and more sharply marked submarginal spots, the latter being developed to large vitreous half moons, especially on the underside. The hindwing above usually with red basal spot, the whole surface of the wing above with a peculiar silky and below a greasy gloss. The female is darker, more conspicuously marked. Shaft of antenna whitish, club black, abdomen whitish, except a small dorsal portion. In specimens which agree with the figure of the name-type the costal and hind-marginal spots of the forewing are heavily centred with red. If specimens in which only the hind-marginal spot is centred red, while all the other spots of the forewing are black, should be considered worth a name venusi Schauf.

Subspecies
Parnassius nomion nomion 
Parnassius nomion aurora O. Bang-Haas, 1933
Parnassius nomion davidis Oberthür, 1879
Parnassius nomion dis Grum-Grshimailo, 1890
Parnassius nomion gabrieli Bryk
Parnassius nomion korshunovi Kreuzberg & Pljushch, 1992
Parnassius nomion mandschuriae Oberthür, 1891
Parnassius nomion minschani Bryk-Eisne
Parnassius nomion nominulus Staudinger, 1895
Parnassius nomion nomius Grum-Grshimailo, 1891
Parnassius nomion oberthuerianus Bryk
Parnassius nomion richthofeni Bang-Haas
Parnassius nomion shansiensis Eisner
Parnassius nomion theagenes Fruhstorfer
Parnassius nomion tsinlingensis Bryk & Eisner

References

 Sakai S., Inaoka S., Toshiaki A., Yamaguchi S., Watanabe Y., (2002) The Parnassiology. The Parnassius Butterflies, A Study in Evolution, Kodansha, Japan. 
Guide to the Butterflies of Russia and adjacent territories Volume 1. Pensoft, Sofia - Moscow. 1997

Further reading
sv:Parnassius nomion Swedish Wikipedia - further references and synonymy

External links
Parnassius of the World - photos, range map and subspecies

nomion
Insects of Korea
Butterflies described in 1823